George Aloysius Vergara (March 18, 1901 – August 13, 1982) was a player in the National Football League. He played with the Green Bay Packers during the 1925 NFL season. He later served as mayor of New Rochelle, New York.

References

1901 births
1982 deaths
Green Bay Packers players
Notre Dame Fighting Irish football coaches
Notre Dame Fighting Irish football players
Mayors of places in New York (state)
Sportspeople from New Rochelle, New York
Baseball players from New York City
20th-century American politicians
Politicians from New Rochelle, New York